Borrego Springs (borrego is Spanish for "sheep") is a census-designated place (CDP) in San Diego County, California. The population was 3,429 at the 2010 census, up from 2,535 at the 2000 census, made up of both seasonal and year-round residents. Borrego Springs is surrounded by Anza-Borrego State Park, California's largest state park.

The village of Borrego Springs is recognized as a designated International Dark Sky Community by the International Dark-Sky Association (IDA). Borrego Springs has no stoplights, and nighttime lighting is kept to a minimum to protect the view of the night sky. The International Dark-Sky Association designated it as California's first International Dark-Sky Community. It is a center for public astronomy activities throughout the year.

Borrego Springs has pueblo-style, modern architecture and ranch-style house architecture. A local landmark is the traffic roundabout between the airport and downtown, Christmas Circle. The town includes a branch of the San Diego County Library.

History
Anza-Borrego State Park's name is derived from Juan Bautista de Anza, who notably camped there, and "borrego", which is Spanish for "lamb", in honor of the local herds of bighorn sheep. The area east of town was the site of a vast World War II US Navy training center, the Borrego Valley Maneuver Area, with supporting camps and airstrips.

Geography and ecology
Borrego Springs is on the floor of the Borrego Valley, which lies at the Sonoran Desert ecoregion's western edge. The village and surrounding countryside have a wide variety of desert flora and fauna. One iconic species found in the Borrego Springs area is the California Fan Palm, Washingtonia filifera, a lower risk/near-threatened species and the only palm native to the western United States. An abandoned calcite mine, dating to World War II, is on the northeast slope of the Santa Rosa Mountains in the state park.

Climate
Borrego Springs has a hot desert climate (Köppen climate classification: BWh). Although snow rarely falls in the lowlands, 6.5 inches fell in December 1967.

Demographics

2010
The 2010 United States Census reported that Borrego Springs had a population of 3,429. The racial makeup of Borrego Springs was 2,766 (80.7%) White, 20 (0.6%) African American, 34 (1.0%) Native American, 22 (0.6%) Asian, 5 (0.1%) Pacific Islander, 500 (14.6%) from other races, and 82 (2.4%) from two or more races. Hispanic or Latino of any race were 1,218 persons (35.5%).

The Census reported that 3,429 people (100% of the population) lived in households, 0 (0%) lived in non-institutionalized group quarters, and 0 (0%) were institutionalized.

There were 1,571 households, out of which 283 (18.0%) had children under the age of 18 living in them, 828 (52.7%) were opposite-sex married couples living together, 82 (5.2%) had a female householder with no husband present, 57 (3.6%) had a male householder with no wife present.  There were 85 (5.4%) unmarried opposite-sex partnerships, and 13 (0.8%) same-sex married couples or partnerships. 507 households (32.3%) were made up of individuals, and 262 (16.7%) had someone living alone who was 65 years of age or older. The average household size was 2.18.  There were 967 families (61.6% of all households); the average family size was 2.76.

The population was spread out, with 592 people (17.3%) under the age of 18, 165 people (4.8%) aged 18 to 24, 477 people (13.9%) aged 25 to 44, 1,044 people (30.4%) aged 45 to 64, and 1,151 people (33.6%) who were 65 years of age or older.  The median age was 56.6 years. For every 100 females, there were 99.5 males.  For every 100 females age 18 and over, there were 100.4 males.

The homeowner vacancy rate was 8.0%; the rental vacancy rate was 12.1%.  2,593 people (75.6% of the population) lived in owner-occupied housing units and 836 people (24.4%) lived in rental housing units.

2000
As of the census of 2000, there were 2,535 people, 1,153 households, and 727 families residing in the CDP. The population density was 59.6 inhabitants per square mile (23.0/km2). The racial makeup of the CDP was 82.8% White, 1.0% African American, 0.4% Native American, 0.2% Asian, 13.1% from other races, and 2.4% from two or more races. Hispanic or Latino of any race were 32.4% of the population.

There were 1,153 households, out of which 19.1% had children under the age of 18 living with them, 53.6% were married couples living together, 6.4% had a female householder with no husband present, and 36.9% were non-families. 29.5% of all households were made up of individuals, and 14.3% had someone living alone who was 65 years of age or older.  The average household size was 2.20 and the average family size was 2.69.

In the CDP the population was spread out, with 18.4% under the age of 18, 4.7% from 18 to 24, 21.2% from 25 to 44, 26.3% from 45 to 64, and 29.3% who were 65 years of age or older.  The median age was 50 years. For every 100 females, there were 105.9 males.  For every 100 females age 18 and over, there were 105.7 males.

The median income for a household in the CDP was $37,045, and the median income for a family was $40,262. Males had a median income of $27,604 versus $26,023 for females. The per capita income for the CDP was $22,761.  About 8.0% of families and 11.2% of the population were below the poverty line, including 16.0% of those under age 18 and 7.3% of those age 65 or over.

Tourism
Tourism is Borrego Springs's primary industry. The nation's largest desert state park, 600,000-acre Anza-Borrego Desert State Park, surrounds the town. There are four public golf courses, a tennis center, and horseback riding, and it is a destination for snowbirds.

Air transportation

From the 1960s through the 1990s, Borrego Springs Airlines and its subsequent iterations provided commercial airline service to and from the local airfield.

Attractions
Members of the International Aerobatic Club have established a practice and competition area adjacent to and directly north of the Borrego Valley Airport. The area was first designated in 1976 and has an operational waiver approved by the Federal Aviation Administration. Aerobatic pilots from California and the southwest U.S. regularly use the airspace for practice and major competitive events; users have included three past national champions. Visitors are welcome to come to the airport and watch the flight activity, which does not interfere with other airport operations. The San Diego Aerobatic Club sponsors two annual competition events, in April and October.

More than 100 large metal statues of animals by sculptor Ricardo Breceda can be found in Galleta Meadows Estate.

Government

In popular culture
The community and surrounding valley are significant sites in some of Dean Koontz's Jane Hawk novels. The town appears in the Liam Neeson movie Taken 3. The town is the setting for a course on the virtual cycling platform RGT (Road Grand Tours)). In the 2022 movie Borrego, the protagonist and her captor trek through the desert searching for Borrego Springs. In the 2022 film Everything Everywhere All at Once, the rock scene was filmed in Anza Borrego Desert State Park, at Font's Point.

See also

References

External links

 Borrego Springs Chamber of Commerce and Visitors Bureau
 Borrego Springs History and Archives

Census-designated places in San Diego County, California
Populated places in the Colorado Desert
Anza-Borrego Desert State Park